Carmen Balagué (born 17 July 1952) is a Spanish actress. She appeared in more than sixty films since 1977.

Selected filmography

References

External links 

1952 births
Living people
Spanish film actresses
20th-century Spanish actresses
21st-century Spanish actresses